The Stade des Costières is a former football stadium in Nîmes, France. Having a capacity of 18,364 people, it was the home of Nîmes Olympique from 1989 to 2022.

Closure and redevelopment 
On 5 November 2022, Nîmes Olympique played its final match at the Stade des Costières, a 1–0 Ligue 2 victory over Bordeaux.

References 

Costieres
Nîmes Olympique
Sports venues in Gard
Buildings and structures in Nîmes
Sports venues completed in 1989
1989 establishments in France
2022 disestablishments in France
Sport in Nîmes